The Molniya (now Vympel) R-60 (NATO reporting name: AA-8 "Aphid") is a short-range lightweight infrared homing air-to-air missile designed for use by Soviet fighter aircraft. It has been widely exported, and remains in service with the CIS and many other nations.

History
The R-60 was initially developed for the MiG-23. Work began on the weapon, under the bureau designation K-60 (izdeliye 62), in the late 1960s. Series production began in 1973. It entered service with the designation R-60 (NATO reporting name "Aphid-A").

It has infrared guidance, with an uncooled Komar (Mosquito) seeker head. Control is by forward rudders with large rear fins. The distinctive canards on the nose, known as "destabilizers," serve to improve the rudders' efficiency at high angles of attack. The R-60 uses a small,  tungsten expanding-rod surrounding a high explosive fragmentation warhead. Two different types of proximity fuze can be fitted: the standard Strizh (Swift) optical fuse, which can be replaced with a Kolibri active radar fuse. Missiles equipped with the latter fuse were designated R-60K.

The weapon was one of the most agile air-to-air missiles until the advent of thrust vectored missiles like the R-73 and AIM-9X. The R-60 can be used by aircraft maneuvering at up to 9g against targets maneuvering at up to 8g. A tactical advantage is the short minimum range of only .

Soviet practice was to manufacture most air-to-air missiles with interchangeable IR-homer and semi-active radar homing (SARH) seekers – however, an SARH version of the R-60 was never contemplated due to the small size of the missile which makes a radar-homing version with an antenna of reasonable size impractical.

An inert training version, alternatively designated UZ-62 and UZR-60, was also built.

An upgraded version, the R-60M (NATO reporting name: "Aphid-B"), using a nitrogen-cooled seeker with an expanded view angle of ±20°, was introduced around 1982. Although its seeker is more sensitive than its predecessor, the R-60M has only limited all-aspect capability. Minimum engagement range was further reduced, to only . The proximity fuzes had improved resistance to ECM, although both optical and radar fuzes remained available. The export version with the Kolibri-M Radar-fuze are designated R-60MK (NATO reporting name: "Aphid-C").

The inert training version of the R-60M was the R-60MU.

Since 1999, a modified version of the weapon has been used as a surface-to-air missile (SAM) as part of the Yugoslav M55A3B1 towed anti-aircraft artillery system. It has also been seen carried on a twin rail mount on a modified M53/59 Praga armored SPAAG of (former) Czechoslovakian origin. These missiles have been modified with the addition of a first stage booster motor, with the missile's own motor becoming the sustainer. This was done in lieu of modifying the missile's motor for ground launch, as in the case of the US MIM-72 Chaparral.

The current Russian dogfight missile is the R-73 (AA-11 "Archer"), but large numbers of R-60 missiles remain in service.

Operational history

Soviet Union
On 20 April 1978, two R-60 missiles were fired at Korean Air Lines Flight 902 after a navigational error had caused it to fly into Soviet airspace. One missile hit, detaching 4 meters of the left wing and killing 2 passengers. The plane made an emergency landing on a frozen lake.

On 21 June 1978, a PVO MiG-23M flown by Pilot Captain V. Shkinder shot down two Iranian Boeing CH-47 Chinook helicopters that had trespassed into Soviet airspace, one helicopter being dispatched by two R-60 missiles and the other by cannon fire.

Syria
Several Russian reports affirm the R-60 was widely used during the 1982 Lebanon war, and it was the main weapon used by the Syrians in air-to-air combat. Some Russian reports affirm that the R-60 was the most successful air-to-air missile deployed by the Syrians in Lebanon over the Bekaa Valley. According to Israeli reports, the vast majority of air-to-air combat consisted of visual range dogfights, and this has been also confirmed by Russian sources. The Russian reports also mentioned that several F-4s, F-16s, and IAI Kfirs were destroyed by R-60s among other aircraft. Israel claims some F-4s and Kfirs were lost in 1982, but lists surface-to-air missiles as responsible for all Israeli aircraft losses. However, on 9 June 1982, a Syrian MiG-21 heavily damaged an F-15 using an R-60, but the Israeli aircraft was able to make it back to its base and was subsequently repaired.

Iraq
On 11 August 1984, during the Iran–Iraq War, an Iraqi Air Force MiG-23ML shot down an Iranian F-14A piloted by Hashem All-e-Agha using an R-60.

On 19 January 1991, during the Gulf War, Iraqi air force pilot Jameel Sayhood claimed to have shot down a Royal Air Force Panavia Tornado with an R-60 missile. However, the Royal Air Force claimed that the aircraft crashed on 22 January 1991 on a bombing mission in Ar Rutba.

Angola/Cuba
On 27 September 1987, during Operation Moduler, two Cuban FAR MiG-23MLs intercepted Captain Arthur Piercy's Mirage F1CZ, which was damaged by either an R-23 or an R-60 fired head-on by Major Alberto Ley Rivas. The explosion destroyed the aircraft's drag chute and damaged the hydraulics. Piercy was able to recover to AFB Rundu, but the aircraft overshot the runway. The impact with the rough terrain caused Piercy's ejection seat to fire, but he failed to separate from the seat and suffered major spinal injuries.

India
In 1999, an Indian Air Force MiG-21 used an infrared-homing R-60 to bring down a Pakistani Navy Breguet Atlantic which intruded over Indian airspace. Part of the wreckage was found in contested territory, this incident is widely known as the Atlantic incident.

Operators

Current operators

Former operators

Passed on to successor states.

Was used on the MiG-21bis. Used concurrently and afterwards on BAE Hawks until the early 2000s. Replaced by the AIM-9M.

Used on MiG-29s

Passed on to successor states.

Passed on to successor states.

References

Citations

Bibliography

 
 
 
 
 

Air-to-air missiles of Russia
Air-to-air missiles of the Soviet Union
Cold War air-to-air missiles of the Soviet Union
Vympel NPO products
Military equipment introduced in the 1970s